The Boston Tea Party was a concert venue located first at 53 Berkeley Street in the South End neighborhood of Boston, Massachusetts, and later relocated to 15 Lansdowne Street in the former site of competitor, the Ark, in Boston's Kenmore Square neighborhood, across the street from Fenway Park. It operated from 1967 to the end of 1970. Its closing was due in part to the increasing cost of hiring bands who were playing more and more at large outdoor festivals and arena rock concerts.

The building that the club occupied at 15 Lansdowne Street later reopened multiple times as different clubs before becoming the Avalon in 1992. However, in 2007 Avalon and its neighboring Axis were closed and demolished to make room for a House of Blues, which is what stands on the land today.

The venue became associated with the psychedelic movement, being similar in this way to other contemporary rock halls such as New York's Fillmore East and Electric Circus, San Francisco's Fillmore West, and Philadelphia's Electric Factory.

History
The Boston Tea Party's first home, on Berkeley Street, was constructed in 1872. The large stained-glass Star of David on the front of the building indicates it was built as a synagogue. It is thought it later became a Unitarian meeting house and street mission. Years later it was converted into a venue that showed underground films, before being bought by Ray Riepen and David Hahn and converted again into a concert venue. It opened as a rock music hall on January 20, 1967.

Originally playing host exclusively to local acts, the venue quickly began to attract famous artists, including the Grateful Dead, Chicago, Neil Young, The J. Geils Band, Frank Zappa, Pink Floyd, Cream, Fleetwood Mac, The Allman Brothers Band, Joe Cocker & the Grease Band, Led Zeppelin, The Stooges, Dr. John, Free, The Buddy Miles Express, Charlie Musselwhite, Jeff Beck, The Who, The Byrds, Santana, Taj Mahal, Ten Years After and Sly and the Family Stone.
In 1968 the first album rock FM station in Boston, WBCN, began broadcasting out of the back room of the Tea Party and went on to be the highest rated rock station in the market.  WBCN was owned by the same owners as the Tea Party.  In 1968 Don Law assumed the management of the Tea Party and Law began bringing it major acts from England.
The cost of admission at the time ranged between $3.00 and $3.50 per show, although The Who exacted a premium for their performance of Tommy, charging $4.50. Light shows designed by Roger Thomas, John Boyd, Deb Colburn, and Ken Brown and performed by Lights By The Road provided the lighting and other effects for many of the performances.  Above the stage, a distinctive arched inscription reading "PRAISE YE THE LORD", remaining from the hall's original use, provided a backdrop.

On New Year's Day 1969, a competing venue called The Ark opened on Lansdowne Street. The Ark's focus was on psychedelic acts; it hosted a famous series of shows by the Grateful Dead on April 21, 22, and 23 of that year. By the summer, The Ark had closed due to poor management and the Boston Tea Party, which had been looking for a larger venue, took over the space.

The Velvet Underground shows

The Velvet Underground, not widely known or appreciated in their own time, played regularly to a packed house at the Boston Tea Party. According to the club's former manager, Steve Nelson, "People in Boston just adopted them, and that ranges from Harvard graduate students to tough kids from the neighborhood...and that really was the start of their, I guess we could call it a residency."

Jonathan Richman, who was strongly influenced by the Velvet Underground, often came to the Tea Party to hear them play.

An infamous concert featuring the Velvet Underground (as headliners) and the recently signed MC5, took place at the Tea Party in December 1968. The MC5 opened with their high energy performance, playing "Kick Out the Jams" to a room full of Up Against the Wall Motherfuckers anarchists (known primarily as "Motherfuckers"). After the MC5's energized performance, one of the Motherfuckers got on stage and started haranguing the audience, directing them to "...burn this place down and take to the streets..." After that display of anarchy, Lou Reed addressed the audience, assuring fans that "...we have nothing to do with what went on earlier and in fact we consider it very stupid." Sterling Morrison (the Velvet Underground's bass and guitar player) is on record as saying that he "...always liked the MC5 musically" but thought they were "...surrounded by and exploited by leeches."

The Tea Party was also the site of a 1969 Velvet Underground show whose bootleg became known as the Guitar Amp Tapes because the microphone was placed inside Lou Reed's amplifier.

In its previous incarnation as a branch of the Filmmakers' Cinémathèque, the Tea Party building itself had a connection to the Velvet Underground: it served as a showcase for underground filmmakers such as Andy Warhol, who managed the band for a time, and Jonas Mekas, a friend who let them rehearse in his loft and filmed their famous performance at the Annual Dinner of the New York Society for Clinical Psychiatry in 1966.

The early history of this venue is documented in the book Mansion on the Hill by Fred Goodman.

Other performances

The Grateful Dead played six shows there: 10/2/69, 10/3/69, 10/4/69, 12/29/69, 12/30/69, and 12/31/69. The 12/31/69 show was the only time the Grateful Dead performed on New Year's Eve outside of the Bay Area in Northern California.
Calendar of performances by group and date on The American Revolution documentary film web site.

See also
 Live in Boston (Fleetwood Mac album)

Notes

References

External links 
 Ray Riepen and The Boston Tea Party

Buildings and structures in Boston
Hippie movement
Former music venues in the United States
1967 establishments in the United States
The Velvet Underground
Rock music venues